This list covers television programs whose first letter (excluding "the") of the title is A.

A

AA

Aaahh!!! Real Monsters (1994–1997)
Aaron Stone (2009–2010)
Aaron's Way (1988)
Aarti Party (2010-2011)

AB

Abadas (2011-2012)
The Abbott and Costello Show (1952–1957)
Abby Hatcher
Abby's
Abby's Ultimate Dance Competition
ABC Galaxy
ABC World News Tonight
A Bit of Fry & Laurie
About Anglia (1960–1990)
Absolutely Fabulous (1992–2012)
A Bunch of Munsch (1991-1992)

AC

Acapulco (1961)
Acapulco Shore (Mexico)
Acceptable.TV (2007–2007)
Access Hollywood (1996–)
According to Jim (2001–2009)
Ace Lightning (2002–2004)
Ace of Cakes (2006–2011)
Ace Ventura: Pet Detective (1995-2000)
Acme Hour (1995)
Action (1999–2000)
Action League Now!
Active Kids (2014)
Action Man (1995–1996)
Action Man (2000–2001)
Action Pack (2022–)

AD

Adam-12 (1968–1975)
Adam Adamant Lives (1966–1967)
Adam Ruins Everything
Adam's Rib (1973–1973)
The Addams Family (1964–1966)
The Addams Family (1992-1993)
Addicted to Food
Adventure Inc. (2002–2003)
Adventure Time (2010-2018)
Adventures in Odyssey (1987-)
Adventures in Paradise
Adventures in Wonderland
The Adventures of Abney & Teal
The Adventures of Batman
The Adventures of Brisco County, Jr.
The Adventures of Champion
The Adventures of Chico and Guapo
The Adventures of Chuck and Friends
The Adventures of Don Coyote and Sancho Panda
The Adventures of Ellery Queen
The Adventures of Jimmy Neutron: Boy Genius
The Adventures of Kid Danger
The Adventures of Mary-Kate & Ashley
The Adventures of Napkin Man!
The Adventures of Ozzie and Harriet
The Adventures of Paddington Bear
The Adventures of Paddy the Pelican
The Adventures of Pete & Pete
The Adventures of Portland Bill
The Adventures of Puss in Boots
The Adventures of Rin Tin Tin
The Adventures of Robin Hood
The Adventures of Rocky and Bullwinkle
The Adventures of Sam & Max: Freelance Police
 The Adventures of Teddy Ruxpin
 Adventures of the Gummi Bears
The Adventures of the Scarlet Pimpernel
Adventures of Sonic The Hedgehog
The Adventures of Super Mario Bros. 3
Adventures of Superman
The Adventures of Tintin
The Adventures of Twizzle (UK)
The Adventures of Wild Bill Hickok
The Adventures of William Tell

AE 
A.E.S. Hudson Street
Æon Flux

AF

The Affair
Afro Samurai
After Dark
After Lately
AfterMASH
Afternoon Live (UK)
The Afternoon Show (Australia)
The Afternoon Show (Ireland)
After the Thrones

AG

Agatha Christie's Poirot (UK)
Age of Love
Agent Binky: Pets of the Universe
Agent Carter
Agents of S.H.I.E.L.D.
Água de Mar (Portugal)
Agatha Christie's Marple (UK)

AI
Ain't That America
Air Power
Airwolf

AK

Akumaizer 3

AL

Aladdin
The Alan Young Show
Alas Smith and Jones
Alcatraz
The Alec Baldwin Show
Alex, Inc.
Alexa & Katie
ALF
ALF Tales
ALF: The Animated Series
Alfred Hitchcock Hour
Alfred Hitchcock Presents
Alfred J. Kwak
Alias
Alias Smith and Jones
Alice (1976)
Alice (2009) (Canada)
Alice, I Think
Alice's Wonderland Bakery
Alien Dawn
Alien Nation
Alien Racers
Aliens in America
Aliens in the Family
All About the Andersons
All About Faces
All About Me
All American
All-American Girl (1994)
All Creatures Great and Small (British series)
All Dogs Go to Heaven: The Series
Allen Gregory
All Elite Wrestling: Dynamite
Allegra's Window
All Grown Up!
All Hail King Julien
All in the Family
All Is Forgiven
All My Children
All of Us
All Rise
All the Small Things (UK)
All Star K! (Philippines)
All That
'Allo 'Allo!
Ally McBeal
Alma's Way
Almost Family
Almost Human
Almost Live!
Almost Never (UK)
Alone
Alphabetical
Alphablocks
Alphas
Altered Carbon
Alvin and the Chipmunks (1983)
Alvin and the Chipmunks (2015)

AM

A Man Called Hawk (1989)
The Amanda Show
The Amazing Chan and the Chan Clan
Amazing Extraordinary Friends
The Amazing Race
The Amazing Race (US)
The Amazing Race Asia
The Amazing Spider-Man (1977)
The Amazing Spiez!
Amazing Stories
The Amazing World Of Gumball
The Amber Rose Show
Amen
America Live with Megyn Kelly
America Says
America This Morning
America's Best Dance Crew
America's Election Headquarters
America's Funniest Home Videos
America's Funniest People
America's Got Talent
America's Got Talent: The Champions
America's Money Class with Suze Orman
America's Most Talented Kid
America's Most Wanted
America's News Headquarters
America's Newsroom
America's Next Great Restaurant
America's Next Top Model
The American Baking Competition
American Bandstand
The American Bible Challenge
American Body Shop
American Chopper
American Crime
American Crime Story
American Dad!
American Dragon: Jake Long
American Dream Derby
American Dreams
The American Embassy
American Family
American Gangster
American Gladiators (1989)
American Gladiators (2008)
American Gothic (1995)
American Gothic (2016)
American Grit
American High
American Horror Story
American Housewife
American Idol (reality)
American Justice
American Masters
American Morning
American Ninja Challenge
American Ninja Warrior
American Ninja Warrior: Ninja vs. Ninja
American Pickers
American Vandal
American Woman
The Americans (1961)
The Americans (2013)
Amphibia

AN

An American Family
Anatole
Ancient Aliens
Andi Mack
Andy Pandy (BBC Children 1960)
Andromeda
The Andy Dick Show
The Andy Griffith Show
Andy Richter Controls the Universe
The Andy Williams Show
Angel
Angel from Hell
Angela Anaconda (Canada)
Angelina Ballerina
Angelina Ballerina: The Next Steps
Angelo Rules
Anger Management
Angry Beavers
Angry Birds Toons
Angry Boys
Angry Kid
Angry Video Game Nerd (Web series)
An Idiot Abroad
Animal Cops: Detroit
Animal Cops: Houston
Animal Cops: Miami
Animal Cops: Phoenix
Animal Cops: San Francisco
Animal Cops: South Africa
Animal Crackers
Animal Jam
Animal Mechanicals (Canada)
Animal Planet Report
Animal Practice
Animaniacs (1993-1998)
Animaniacs (2020-)
The Animals of Farthing Wood
Animorphs
Anna and the King
The Anna Nicole Show
Anne with an E
Annie Oakley
Another Day
Another World
Annoying Orange (Web series)
A.N.T. Farm
Anthony Bourdain: No Reservations
Anthony Bourdain: Parts Unknown
Any Day Now
Any Dream Will Do
Anyone for Tennyson?
Anything but Love
Anything You Can Do
Annedroids

AP
APB
A.P. Bio
Appalachia: A History of Mountains and People
Apple & Onion
Apple's Way
The Apprentice (UK)
The Apprentice (US)
The Apprentice: Martha Stewart
Après Ski

AQ

The Aquabats! Super Show!
Aquarium (Canada)
Aqua Teen Hunger Force
Aquaman

AR

Archer
Archie Bunker's Place
Archie's Weird Mysteries
Are You Afraid of the Dark?
Are You Being Served?
Are You Hot?
Are You Smarter than a 5th Grader?
Are You Smarter than a 5th Grader? (US)
Are You the One?
Are You The One Brazil
Are You There, Chelsea?
Ark II
Armed & Famous
Army Wives (2007–2013)
Arnie
Around the Horn
Around the World in 80 Days (UK)
The Arrangement (2010)
The Arrangement (2017)
Arrested Development
The Arrow
Arrow
Arrows (UK)
Armstrong Circle Theatre
The Arsenio Hall Show
Art Attack
Arthur
Arthur Godfrey and His Friends
Arthur Godfrey's Talent Scouts
The Arthur Murray Party

AS

As The World Turns
As Told by Ginger
Ash vs. Evil Dead
Ashes To Ashes
The Ashlee Simpson Show
Ashlee + Evan
Asia's Next Top Model
Ask the StoryBots
As the Bell Rings (2007) (UK)
As the Bell Rings (2007) (USA)
As the Bell Rings (2007) (Australia)
Ask the Family (UK)
Ask This Old House
The Assistants
Astroblast!
The Astronauts
The Astronaut Wives Club (2015)

AT

The A-Team
Atlanta
Atlantis (British)
Atom Ant
Atomic Betty
Atomic Puppet
Attack of the Killer Tomatoes!
Attack of the Show!
Attack on Titan
Atypical
At the Movies
A Touch of Frost (UK)
Atchoo!

AU

Auction Hunters
Audrina
Augie Doggie and Doggie Daddy
Austin & Ally
Austin City Limits
Australia's Next Top Model

AV

Avatar: The Last Airbender
The Avengers
The Avengers: Earth's Mightiest Heroes
Average Joe

AW

AWA Championship Wrestling
Awake
AwesomenessTV
Awkward
 Away (2020)

AX 

 Axe Cop

Previous:  List of television programs: numbers    Next:  List of television programs: B